Lý Thiên Bảo (traditional Chinese: 李天寶, pinyin: Lǐ Tiānbǎo) (499–555) was the older brother of Lý Nam Đế, who tried unsuccessfully to resist the forces of China's Liang dynasty.

The Lý family was of Chinese descent, the ancestors of his family were Chinese who fled Wang Mang's seizure of power during the interregnum between the Western and Eastern Han dynasties. In 548 Lý Nam Đế had fallen ill while resisting the Liang dynasty forces led by Chen Baxian (founder of the Chen dynasty) in the Northwest Vietnam mountains. Lý Nam Đế decided to relinquish his imperial authority and transferred his power to his older brother Thiên Bảo and trusted lieutenant Triệu Quang Phục as co-rulers in his place with the intention of continuing the struggle against the Han.

In 555, Lý Thiên Bảo fell ill and died without leaving an heir, thus making Triệu Quang Phục as sole ruler. Triệu Quang Phục, better known as the emperor Triệu Việt Vương, was able to consolidate the armed forces under Lý Thiên Bảo and Lý Nam Đế against the Han invasion.

References

499 births
555 deaths
Early Lý Dynasty Kings
Hoa people
6th-century monarchs in Asia
5th-century Vietnamese people
6th-century Vietnamese people